Sir Peter Francis Thorne (6 August 1914 – 16 March 2004) was a British Army officer.

Family and education
Thorne was the son of General Sir Augustus Francis Andrew Nicol Thorne and the Hon. Margaret Douglas-Pennant (daughter of George Douglas-Pennant, 2nd Baron Penrhyn). His cousin was the courtier Dame Frances Campbell-Preston.

He was educated at Eton College before attending Trinity College, Oxford. Whilst at Oxford, in 1934, he joined the regimental reserve of the Grenadier Guards, his father's regiment.

In 1959 Thorne married the physicist Anne Patricia Pery (daughter of Edmund Colquhoun Pery, 5th Earl of Limerick, and Angela Olivia Trotter), with whom he had one son and three daughters.

Career
Thorne crossed to France with the 3rd Battalion of the Grenadier Guards in 1939 to fight in World War II. He was wounded at Comines, Nord, during the Allied retreat to Dunkirk.

In 1976 he served as the 33rd Serjeant-at-Arms of the House of Commons.

Thorne was a member of the Cavalry and Guards Club and the Royal Yacht Squadron.

He died on 16 March 2004, aged 89.

Publications

References

1914 births
2004 deaths
Serjeants-at-Arms of the British House of Commons
British Army personnel of World War II
People educated at Eton College
Alumni of Trinity College, Oxford
Grenadier Guards officers